"All Those Years Ago" is a song by English musician George Harrison, released in May 1981 as a single from his album Somewhere in England. Having previously recorded the music for the song, Harrison tailored the lyrics to serve as a personal tribute to his former Beatles bandmate John Lennon, following the latter's murder in 1980. Ringo Starr is featured on drums, and Paul McCartney (along with his Wings bandmates Linda McCartney and Denny Laine) overdubbed backing vocals onto the basic track. The single spent three weeks at number 2 on the US Billboard Hot 100, behind "Bette Davis Eyes" by Kim Carnes, and it peaked at number 13 on the UK Singles Chart. It also topped Canada's RPM singles chart and spent one week at number 1 on Billboards Adult Contemporary listings.

"All Those Years Ago" was the first recording on which Harrison, McCartney and Starr all appeared since the Beatles' "I Me Mine" (1970), and their last recording together until "Free as a Bird" (1995). Other musicians performing on the track include Al Kooper and Ray Cooper. The song has appeared on the Harrison compilations Best of Dark Horse 1976–1989 and Let It Roll, and a live version recorded in 1991 with Eric Clapton was included on Harrison's Live in Japan double album. In 2010, AOL Radio listeners voted "All Those Years Ago" in sixth place on a list of the "10 Best George Harrison Songs". The track has been featured in the books 1,001 Songs You Must Hear Before You Die, and 10,001 You Must Download by Robert Dimery, and Bruce Pollock's The 7,500 Most Important Songs of 1944–2000.

Origins
Prior to Lennon's death, Harrison originally wrote the song with different lyrics for Ringo Starr to record. Although he recorded it, Starr felt the vocal was too high for his range and disliked the lyrics. Harrison took the track back and, after Lennon's death, the lyrics were changed to reflect a tribute to him. In the song, Harrison makes reference to the Beatles song "All You Need Is Love" and the Lennon song "Imagine" ("you were the one who Imagined it all").

Band line-up
The recording of the song featured all three remaining Beatles (Harrison, Starr and Paul McCartney), though this was expressly a Harrison single. It is one of only a few non-Beatles songs to feature three members of the band. Harrison and Starr recorded the song at Harrison's Friar Park studio between 19 November and 25 November 1980. The lineup was rounded out by Al Kooper on keyboards, Herbie Flowers on bass and percussionist Ray Cooper. Harrison co-produced the recording with Cooper.

After Lennon's death the following month, Harrison removed Starr's vocals (but kept Starr's drumming track) and recorded his own vocals with rewritten lyrics honouring Lennon. McCartney, his wife Linda and their Wings bandmate Denny Laine visited Friar Park and recorded backing vocals as an overdub to the original track. The album's liner notes also thank the Beatles' former producer George Martin and engineer Geoff Emerick, who were present at the session where the backing vocals were recorded.  Martin, Emerick and the members of Wings were working on McCartney's Tug Of War album at the time, and had traveled to Harrison's studio to record a Harrison guitar overdub for that album.  The session instead turned into a vocal session for "All Those Years Ago", and Harrison's guitar piece for McCartney's album was never recorded.

Reception
Record World described the song as a "buoyant reminiscence [that] features George's fluid guitar lines with help from Paul, Ringo and Linda."

Music video
The music video features a slide show-type presentation of stills and short archival video clips. The emphasis is on Lennon and, to a lesser degree, Harrison. The post-Beatles stills of Lennon at older ages are countered with stills of Harrison from the same time frame.

Personnel
George Harrison – vocals, electric guitars, synthesizer, backing vocals
Al Kooper – electric piano
Herbie Flowers – bass
Ringo Starr – drums
Ray Cooper – tambourine
Paul McCartney – backing vocals
Linda McCartney – backing vocals
Denny Laine – backing vocals

Chart performance

Weekly charts

Year-end charts

See also
 List of number-one adult contemporary singles of 1981 (U.S.)
 "Here Today", Paul McCartney's 1982 tribute song to Lennon

References

George Harrison songs
1981 singles
Songs written by George Harrison
Song recordings produced by George Harrison
Music published by Oops Publishing and Ganga Publishing, B.V.
Dark Horse Records singles
1981 songs
Songs about John Lennon